Baruwar /Barwar is a cadet branch of Bais (Kshatriya clan) found in Ayodhya  District of Uttar Pradesh, India. Baruwars   are descendant of Raja Trilokchand son of Shatan dev. According to their claim they came to Ayodhya in late 16th century from Daundiya Kheda  of district Unnao which is their place of origin.

History 
Their two ancestors were named Bariyaar singh and Chahu Singh, both were son of Raja Chattarsen chattrapati the 7th descendants of king Trilokchandra.
 On the name of Bariyaar Shah (Locally known as baruwar some say to them bariyaar bais too ) whole clan is known. In reality they are bais Kshatriya who migrated  from daudiyakheda ,local Kshatriya due to their pronunciation started calling them Baruwar     In 1570 Bariyaar singh and chahu singh both were imprisoned by Akbar while fighting for other Rajput principalities. Later after release, they conquered Pargana Amsin of Awadh and established a separate Taluka Pali which was spread in 14 Kos. By 1227 fasali i.e.1820 there were 159 villages under the control of baruwars which were later abolished till Indian Rebellion of 1857. Currently there are 42 villages of Baruwar Kshatriyas in Maya bazar Vikaas khand of district Ayodhya. 
 Kshatriya.

References 

Rajput clans of Uttar Pradesh